Pyrimidine analogues are antimetabolites which mimic the structure of metabolic pyrimidines.

Examples
Nucleobase analogues
Fluorouracil (5FU), which inhibits thymidylate synthase
Floxuridine (FUDR)
6-azauracil (6-AU)
Nucleoside analogues
Cytarabine (Cytosine arabinoside)
Gemcitabine 
Nucleotide analogues

Medical uses
Pyrimidine antimetabolites are commonly used to treat cancer by interfering with DNA replication.

References

Antimetabolites
Metabolism
Pyrimidines